RGB-60 (Rocket Guided Bomb model 60) is a Russian anti-submarine weapon with a range of 5,700–6,000 m that can function to depths of 500 m. They can be fired from ships in salvos of up to 12 using the RBU-6000. Versions of the RGB-60 were provided to the Indian Navy with a strike range of 1,500 m.

References

Anti-submarine missiles
Anti-ship missiles of Russia